Climate psychology is a field which aims to further our understanding of the psychological processes that occur in response to climate change and its resultant effects. It also seeks to promote creative ways to engage with the public about climate change; contribute to change at the personal, community, cultural and political levels; support activists, scientists and policy makers to bring about effective change; to nurture psychological resilience to the destructive impacts of climate change happening now and in the future.

Definition 
Climate psychology can refer to:

 Effects of climate change on mental health
 Psychological impact of climate change
 Psychological aspects surrounding climate inaction
 Psychological aspects surrounding climate communication (see Climate communication#Applying findings from psychology)
 Psychology of climate change denial

Academic discipline 
Climate psychology is a trans-disciplinary approach to research and practice. It focuses on the society-wide reluctance to take appropriate action in relation to the escalating threat of climate change. It sees the problem as requiring a deeper approach, that examines our resistance to knowing and acting, rather than seeing it as an “information deficit” to be treated by cognitive or behavioural approaches. It stresses the significance of human emotions, identities and cultural assumptions. Furthermore, it acknowledges the human subject as nested within their social and ecological context.

In order to meet its aims and develop its approach, climate psychology draws on a broad range of perspectives, including: literature, philosophy, world religions, the arts, humanities and systems thinking. The core of the approach is based on various psychotherapeutic traditions and psycho-social studies, allowing climate psychologists to understand the unconscious or unacknowledged emotions and processes influencing people’s thoughts, motivations and behaviours. This applies especially to these processes that manifest in the broader context of the wider society and culture.

As of 2020, the discipline of climate psychology had grown to include many subfields. Climate psychologists are working with the United nations, with national and local governments, with corporations, NGOs and individuals.

Climate psychology in practice 
In recent years, climate psychologists are facilitating support groups for activists, particularly those active in the support of pro-environmental behaviours across society. They are also developing initiatives such as co-operative inquiry, a method of doing research into psychological phenomena where the participants are fully involved and act as co-researchers, allowing for a broader range of richer, qualitative data. In August of 2022, scientists and their colleagues came together to protest rebellion outside of the Department of Business, Energy, and Industrial Strategy in London. During this time, as shown on the news, many climate scientists were having mental breakdowns and showing extreme signs of emotional turmoil and anguish. Climate psychologists over the years having watched not only scientists go through this environmental change, seeing how it has negatively impacted millions. They support groups through behavioral practices and studies to help obtain precise data and comprehension from person to person within these activist groups.

A study in 2021 found that mental health issues related to climate change are recognized by Polish psychologists and psychotherapists.

Climate change and psychological defences 
Non-avoidant coping has three predominant forms: active coping, which is direct action taken to deal with a stressful situation; acceptance, which is cognitive and emotional acknowledgement of stressful realities; and cognitive reinterpretation, which involves learning or positive reframing. A distinction can also be made between proactive and reactive coping. Proactive coping, also known as anticipatory adaptation or psychological preparedness, is made in anticipation of an event. On the other hand, reactive coping is made during or after the event.

Climate psychologists consider how coping responses can be adaptive or maladaptive, not just personally but also for the wider environment and ecology. More precisely, do the responses promote positive psychological adjustment and stimulate appropriate and proportional pro-environmental action, or do they serve to justify the individual in their inaction and allow them to refrain from the necessary, radical changes?

Psycho-social approaches 

A psycho-social approach to Climate psychology examines the interplay between internal, psychological factors and external, socio-cultural factors- such as values, beliefs and norms- in people’s responses to climate change. Furthermore, it offers a distinctive qualitative methodology for understanding the lived experience of research subjects, which has been adopted by researchers seeking to investigate how climate change and environmental destruction is experienced by different groups across society. In this case, ‘lived experience’ refers to the feelings, thoughts and imaginations and the meaning frames which both affect and are effected by those experiences.  

Coping responses to impending climate destabilisation are psycho-social phenomena, culturally sanctioned and maintained by social norms and structures, not simply isolated psychological processes. For example, modern mass consumerism is dictated by the needs of a globalised, deregulated economy, yet it is one of the driving forces of climate change. It has been suggested that this “culture of un-care” performs an ideological function, insulating consumers from experiencing too much anxiety and moral disquiet.

Cultural mechanisms also support ways of down-regulating the powerful feelings that would otherwise be elicited by the awareness of potential threats. These include strong, embedded cultural assumptions such as entitlement, exceptionalism and faith in progress. Entitlement is the belief that certain groups or species deserve more than others and is embedded in the unequal relations governing developed and developing human societies. Exceptionalism is the idea that one’s species, nation, ethnic group or individual self is special and therefore absolved from the rules that apply to others, giving licence to breach natural limits of resource consumption. Faith in progress, a key element of post-industrial ideology, results in a conviction that science and technology can solve every problem, therefore encouraging wishful thinking and false optimism.

History 
The origins of climate psychology can be traced back to the work of psychoanalyst Harold Searles and his work on the unconscious factors that influence the estrangement of people from the rest of nature. It has also been strongly influenced by the field of Ecopsychology and its emphasis on the relationships of people with the natural world. Due to the increase in society-wide acceptance of the dangers of climate change, there has been greater interest in understanding the psychological processes underlying the resistance to taking appropriate action, and in particular, the phenomenon of climate change denial. More recently, a literature base by climate psychologists has started to focus on the powerful emotions associated with climate change and planetary-wide biodiversity loss.

See also 

 Ecopsychology
 Effects of climate change on mental health
 Environmental Psychology
 Ecological Grief
 Psychology of climate change denial

References

External links 

 Climate Psychologists
 Climate Psychology Alliance
 Psychologists for a Safe Climate
 Climate & Mind

Environmental psychology
Climate change and society
Climate
Climate change